Shakedown (also known in international markets as Blue Jean Cop) is a 1988 American action crime drama film written and directed by James Glickenhaus, starring Peter Weller and Sam Elliott. The plot concerns an idealistic lawyer who teams with a veteran cop to find out the truth in a possible police corruption scandal.

Plot
Roland Dalton is a burned-out, mild-mannered Manhattan public defender, and his last case before leaving legal aid is crack dealer Michael Jones, accused of shooting to death police officer Patrick O'Leary in Central Park. According to Jones, the shooting was in self-defense and officer O'Leary was a "Blue Jean Cop" (an opportunistic police officer who robs drug dealers).

Being a creature of habit, Dalton seeks the truth to his mysterious case and looks to Richie Marks, a renegade loner NYPD narcotics agent. Dalton realizes the prosecutor in his last case is a former love interest, the smart and sexy Susan Cantrell. Throughout the trial Roland rekindles this former affair with Susan unbeknownst to his fiancée Gail.

Roland and Marks eventually learn that O'Leary was working with a large number of dirty cops who purchased blue jeans and an expensive car. The dirty cops were working with drug lord Nicky Carr. Roland at one point breaks into the police station's evidence locker to locate the cassette tape that Jones had in a boom box radio at the time of his shooting. The tape recorded the entire incident and when Roland attempts to get the tape he is taken hostage by the team of dirty cops. Just before Roland is going to be killed, Marks bursts into the room and shoots the cops, saving Roland.

Although Roland makes it to court with the assistance of an insane cab driver, the judge refuses to allow the tape into evidence. After making an impassioned closing statement, the jury acquits Jones of the shooting. Marks then shows up in a Porsche purchased by O'Leary and they go to the airport to hunt down Carr and the last of the dirty cops. Richie jumps onto the plane's landing gear and after shooting out an engine and tossing a hand grenade into the landing gear compartment, he jumps to safety before the plane explodes.

The movie ends with Roland again working as a public defender. He has broken up with Gail and is once again dating Susan.

Cast

Critical reception
Shakedown garnered generally positive reviews from critics. It holds a 70% approval rating on Rotten Tomatoes, based on 10 reviews, with an average score of 6.6/10.

Roger Ebert commended Glickenhaus for showing a "tremendous amount of craftsmanship and skill" when sacrificing story to direct his action scenes and gave praise to both Weller and Elliott for being "strong, unsubtle but convincing" in their respective roles, saying "It's an assembly of sensational moments, strung together by a plot that provides the excuses for amazing stunts, and not much else." Gene Siskel of the Chicago Tribune called the film "a rollicking, thrilling and funny police picture", praising Glickenhaus' direction for containing a "mixture of reality and way-out thrills" in the action sequences, saying that "Shakedown moves with an intelligence, speed and joy in everything from writing to stunt work. A picture this much fun can keep a movie lover happy for a week." Kevin Thomas from the Los Angeles Times felt that Elliott lacked equal screen time alongside Weller for his character to remain in the viewer's mind, but he also praised Glickenhaus for keeping the film "terse, fast-moving and atmospheric" throughout the plot and into the action set pieces, calling it "mindlessly enjoyable escapist fare".

References

External links

1988 films
1988 action thriller films
1980s American films
1980s buddy cop films
1980s crime action films
1980s English-language films
1980s mystery films
American action thriller films
American buddy cop films
American crime action films
American crime thriller films
American mystery films
Films about police corruption
Films about police misconduct
Films directed by James Glickenhaus
Films scored by Jonathan Elias
Films set in New York City
Films shot in New York City
Universal Pictures films